The Lovers is a 1946 Italian historical melodrama film directed by Giacomo Gentilomo. It was entered into the 1946 Cannes Film Festival.

Cast
 Gino Bechi as Alessandro Stradella
 Annette Bach as Ortenzia Foscarini
 Ernesto Bianchi as Furlan
 Wanda Capodaglio as Madame Royal
 Emilio Cigoli
 Antonio Crast as Marco Foscarini
 Mario Gallina as Bottesin
 Kozma Kumani 
 Armando Guarnieri
 Nino Marchetti
 Franca Marzi as Porzia
 Guido Morisi as Il capitano
 Carlo Ninchi
 Giovanni Petrucci (as Giovanni Petti)
 Lamberto Picasso as L'astrologo
 Gino Saltamerenda as Frate Nespola
 Fabrizio Sarazani
 Gualtiero Tumiati as Alvise Foscarini

References

External links

1946 films
Italian drama films
1940s Italian-language films
1946 drama films
Italian black-and-white films
Films directed by Giacomo Gentilomo
Films set in the 1680s
Films about classical music and musicians
Films about composers
Melodrama films
1940s Italian films